The seventh season of Skal vi danse? was held in 2011.

Couples

Scoring chart

Red numbers indicate the lowest score for each week.
Green numbers indicate the highest score for each week.
 indicates the couple eliminated that week.
 The couple are in the bottom two that week.
 indicates the winning couple.
 indicates the runner-up couple.
 indicates the third-place couple.

Highest and lowest scoring performances of the series 
The best and worst performances in each dance according to the judges' marks are as follows:

Average chart

Dance schedule
The celebrities and professional partners danced one of these routines for each corresponding week.
 Week 1: Waltz or Cha-Cha-Cha
 Week 2: Quickstep or Paso Doble
 Week 3: Tango or Rumba
 Week 4: Jive or Cha-Cha-Cha
 Week 5: Samba
 Week 6: Quickstep, Slowfox, or Waltz & Team Cha-Cha-Cha
 Week 7: Showdance
 Week 8: Two unlearned dances
 Week 9: One unlearned dance, one repeated dance
 Week 10: One ballroom dance, one Latin dance, Showdance

Songs

Week 1
Individual judges scores in the chart below (given in parentheses) are listed in this order from left to right: Trine Dehli Cleve, Tor Fløysvik, Karianne Gulliksen, Christer Tornell.

Week 2
Individual judges scores in the chart below (given in parentheses) are listed in this order from left to right: Trine Dehli Cleve, Tor Fløysvik, Karianne Gulliksen, Christer Tornell.

Judges' votes to save

 Dehli Cleve: Rachel & Henrik
 Fløysvik: Rachel & Henrik 
 Gulliksen: Lars & Alexandra 
 Tornell: Lars & Alexandra

Week 3
Individual judges scores in the chart below (given in parentheses) are listed in this order from left to right: Trine Dehli Cleve, Tor Fløysvik, Karianne Gulliksen, Christer Tornell.

Week 4
Individual judges scores in the chart below (given in parentheses) are listed in this order from left to right: Trine Dehli Cleve, Tor Fløysvik, Karianne Gulliksen, Christer Tornell.

 Anders Jacobsen decided at the last minute in the Saturday evening to withdraw.

Week 5
Individual judges scores in the chart below (given in parentheses) are listed in this order from left to right: Trine Dehli Cleve, Tor Fløysvik, Karianne Gulliksen, Christer Tornell.

Week 6
Individual judges scores in the chart below (given in parentheses) are listed in this order from left to right: Trine Dehli Cleve, Tor Fløysvik, Karianne Gulliksen, Christer Tornell.

Week 7
Individual judges scores in the chart below (given in parentheses) are listed in this order from left to right: Trine Dehli Cleve, Tor Fløysvik, Karianne Gulliksen, Christer Tornell.

Week 8
Individual judges scores in the chart below (given in parentheses) are listed in this order from left to right: Trine Dehli Cleve, Tor Fløysvik, Karianne Gulliksen, Christer Tornell.

Week 9
Individual judges scores in the chart below (given in parentheses) are listed in this order from left to right: Trine Dehli Cleve, Tor Fløysvik, Karianne Gulliksen, Christer Tornell.

Week 10
Individual judges scores in the chart below (given in parentheses) are listed in this order from left to right: Trine Dehli Cleve, Tor Fløysvik, Karianne Gulliksen, Christer Tornell.

Call-out Order
The table below lists the order in which the contestants' fates were revealed. The order of the safe couples doesn't reflect the viewer voting results.

 This couple came in first place with the judges.
 This couple came in last place with the judges.
 This couple came in last place with the judges and was eliminated.
 This couple was eliminated.
 This couple was not eliminated.
 This couple withdrew from the competition.
 This couple won the competition.
 This couple came in second in the competition.

Dance chart

 Highest scoring dance
 Lowest scoring dance

See also
Skal vi danse?
Skal vi danse? (season 4)
Skal vi danse? (season 5)
Skal vi danse? (season 6)
Dancing with the Stars International Versions

References

External links

2011 Norwegian television seasons
Skal vi danse?